The South Open, or Abierto del Sur, is one of the major regional open golf tournaments in Argentina, and is also one of the oldest, having been inaugurated 1918. It has always been held at the Mar del Plata Golf Club in Mar del Plata, Buenos Aires Province. The course plays to a par of 70, and the course record is 59, which was set by Miguel Ángel Martín in the 1987 Open.

The tournament was founded as the Abierto de Aficionados y Profesionales (the Professionals and Amateurs Open), and was renamed as the Abierto de Mar del Plata (Mar del Plata Open) in 1925, before being given its current title in 1939.

Winners

External links
Tour de las Americas - official site
TPG Tour - official site
Mar del Plata Golf Club - official site

Golf tournaments in Argentina
Tour de las Américas events